Ibrahima Dramé (born 6 October 2001) is a Senegalese footballer who plays as a forward for Austrian club Austria Wien and their reserve squad, Young Violets.

Club career
On 8 January 2020, Austrian first tier side LASK announced the signing of Dramé for 3.5 years until summer 2023. Initially he was designated to LASK's reserve team Juniors OÖ playing in second tier.

He made his Austrian Football First League debut for Juniors OÖ as a starter on 21 February 2020 in a home game against SV Lafnitz.

International career
Dramé was capped for Senegal U20 during the 2019 Africa U-20 Cup and the 2019 FIFA U-20 World Cup. In 2019, he also earned two caps for the Senegal national football team.

References

External links
 
 

2001 births
Living people
Senegalese footballers
Senegal international footballers
Association football forwards
FC Juniors OÖ players
FK Austria Wien players
2. Liga (Austria) players
Austrian Football Bundesliga players
Senegalese expatriate footballers
Expatriate footballers in Austria
Senegalese expatriate sportspeople in Austria